Shakha, a Hindu theological school
 Kaṭha Upaniṣad, one of the mukhya Upanishads
 Aranyaka, part of the Vedas concerned with the meaning of ritual sacrifice
Katha is the Hindi name for Catechu, an extract of acacia used in Ayurvedic medicine

See also
 Katha (disambiguation)